Arthur Gustav Shefte was an author of music books. He was born on 4 February 1899 in Chicago, Illinois, and died on 12 February 1975. One reference says he is buried at Graceland Cemetery, Chicago.
Another reference says cremated and ashes in Rosehill Cemetery.

Art Shefte changed his name from Sakrzewsky to Shefte on June 29, 1920; the name change case number is 355854.

His wife's first name was Babe.

Musical Works 
Jazz Breaks

Piano Improvising, Volume 1 : A Positive System Showing How to Convert Popular Songs from the Printed Form into Modern Professional Style, 1936

References

1899 births
1975 deaths
20th-century American pianists
American male pianists
20th-century American male musicians